Aliabad-e Faqih Mahalleh (also Romanized as ‘Alīābād-e Faqīh Maḩalleh; also known as ‘Alīābād) is a village in Goli Jan Rural District, in the Central District of Tonekabon County, Mazandaran Province, Iran. At the 2006 census, its population was 133, in 41 families.

References 

Populated places in Tonekabon County